George Curtis Wing Jr. (born October 6, 1878March 18, 1951) was an American politician and lawyer from Maine. He was born in Livermore, Maine and raised in Auburn, Maine, where he attended Edward Little High School. He then attended Brown University, graduating in 1900 and Harvard University School of Law in 1903. He represented his hometown of Auburn in the Maine House of Representatives for five terms. He was first elected in 1908. Leaving office after one term, he was sent back to the House in 1920, 1922, 1924, and 1926. In 1922, he unsuccessfully sought election as Speaker of the Maine House of Representatives.

He was a leading politician in Auburn for many years. He was a leading voice in the successful campaign to institute a city manager system of government, as well as city solicitor, library trustee, member of the Board of Education, and as mayor from 1934-35. He served as President of the Board of Trustees of the Auburn Public Library from 1939–51.

He died in 1951 at the age of 72 and is buried at Mount Auburn Cemetery.

References

1878 births
1951 deaths
Politicians from Auburn, Maine
School board members in Maine
Maine lawyers
Members of the Maine House of Representatives
Harvard Law School alumni
Brown University alumni
Edward Little High School alumni